Prior to Algerian independence in 1962, trade unions in Algeria were structured within regional organizations of French trade unions. After independence the General Union of Algerian Workers (UGTA) became the sole trade union center. The UGTA was linked with the Front de Libération nationale; however, in 1989, with constitutional changes and new laws the UGTA was distanced from the FLN and no longer retained the position of sole trade union center. Despite this, the UGTA continues to be, in practice, the only center - with few trade unions outside its affiliation.

During the Algerian Civil War the trade union movement was caught in the same violence that killed large numbers of civilians. Both ICTUR and Amnesty International report many deaths of trade union activists, concluding that the reasons for their deaths are difficult to determine, given the chaotic times. Reasons range from deaths directly related to union activities, through to other political issues (such as fundamentalist views of women teachers), and endemic random violence.

References

 
International Confederation of Arab Trade Unions
Economy of the Arab League